Tomislav Colić (born October 13, 1987) is a Serbian footballer formerly with Los Angeles Blues in the USL Professional Division and Anaheim Bolts in the Professional Arena Soccer League.

Career

Youth and amateur
Colić played for the youth team of Serbian SuperLiga club FK Vojvodina, and came to the United States in 2007 after being offered a college soccer scholarship at Vanguard University of Southern California in Costa Mesa, California. He was an NAIA All-American Honorable Mention in 2008, NAIA Second-Team All-American in 2009 and garnered All-GSAC recognition in each of his first three years at Vanguard.

During his college years Colić also played in the USL Premier Development League for the Southern California Seahorses and Vermont Voltage. In 2009, Colić was named to the USL Premier Development League All-Western Conference Team.

Professional
Colić turned professional when he signed with the expansion Los Angeles Blues of the new USL Professional League in February 2011. He made his professional debut on April 15, 2011 in a 3-0 victory over Sevilla Puerto Rico, and scored his first two professional goals on April 20, in a 4-2 win over Puerto Rico United.
At the completion of his rookie season in the USL, Colić signed with the Anaheim Bolts in November 2011. He scored 16 goals in 13 appearances for the Bolts, earning a spot in the PASL Top 20 Scoring Leaders for the 2011-12 season.

References

External links
 Vanguard bio

1987 births
Living people
Serbian footballers
Southern California Seahorses players
Vermont Voltage players
Orange County SC players
USL League Two players
Serbian expatriate footballers
Expatriate soccer players in the United States
Association football midfielders
USL Championship players
People from Inđija